The Right Combination • Burning the Midnight Oil is the seventh collaborative studio album by Porter Wagoner and Dolly Parton. It was released on January 3, 1972, by RCA Victor.

The album was made available as a digital download on January 4, 2019.

Critical reception

The review published in the January 15, 1972 issue of Billboard said, "Porter and Dolly have here an LP that will be a big hit for them in the first few months of 1972. Each of the stars has written a few cuts and their performance
of their own material is beautiful. Highlights include "The Right Combination", "More Than Words Can Tell", "The Fog Has Lifted", and "Her and the Car and the Mobile Home" (a comedy spotlight)."

Cashbox published a review in the January 15, 1972 issue that said, "Judging from their popularity it's undisputable that Porter Wagoner and Dolly Parton have the right combination to open the doors of success. Unlike most other C&W duets who spend most of the time harmonizing with occasional solos, Porter & Dolly are not only adept at their harmonies, they allow each other room for individual expression within the scope of each arrangement. Most unique is the extent to which they feel at ease with each other; the goodtime dialogue and banter in songs such as "I've Been This Way Too Long" is as much a part of the right combination as the music."

Commercial performance
The album peaked at No. 6 on the US Billboard Hot Country LP's chart.

The album's first single, "The Right Combination", was released in May 1971 and peaked at No. 14 on the US Billboard Hot Country Singles chart and No. 106 on the US Billboard Bubbling Under the Hot 100 chart. It peaked at No. 26 in Canada on the RPM Country Singles chart. The second single, "Burning the Midnight Oil", was released in October 1971 and peaked at No. 11 on the US Billboard Hot Country Singles chart and No. 9 in Canada on the RPM Country Singles chart.

Recording
Recording sessions for the album began on April 7 and 8, 1971, at RCA Studio B in Nashville, Tennessee. Two additional sessions followed on September 28 and 30. "Her and the Car and the Mobile Home" was recorded on December 9, 1970, during a session for 1971's Two of a Kind.

Track listing

Personnel
Adapted from the album liner notes.

David Briggs – piano
Jerry Carrigan – drums
Pete Drake – steel guitar
Bobby Dyson – bass
Bob Ferguson – producer
Jack Hurst – liner notes
Dave Kirby – electric guitar
Les Leverett – cover photo
Mack Magaha – fiddle
George McCormick – rhythm guitar
Al Pachucki – recording engineer
Dolly Parton – lead vocals
Hargus Robbins – piano
Billy Sanford – rhythm guitar
Roy Shockley – recording technician
Jerry Shook – electric guitar
Buddy Spicher – fiddle
Jerry Stembridge – rhythm guitar
Charles Trent – electric banjo
Porter Wagoner – lead vocals

Charts
Album

Singles

Release history

References

1972 albums
Dolly Parton albums
Porter Wagoner albums
Albums produced by Bob Ferguson (music)
Vocal duet albums
RCA Records albums